Franz Tiefenbacher (born 16 September 1942) is an Austrian luger. He competed in the men's singles event at the 1964 Winter Olympics.

References

1942 births
Living people
Austrian male lugers
Olympic lugers of Austria
Lugers at the 1964 Winter Olympics
People from Baden District, Austria
Sportspeople from Lower Austria